Friedrich Wilhelm, Duke of Schleswig-Holstein-Sonderburg-Glücksburg (4 January 1785 – 17 February 1831) inherited the title of Duke of Schleswig-Holstein-Sonderburg-Beck as Frederick William IV in 1816. He subsequently changed his title to Duke of Schleswig-Holstein-Sonderburg-Glücksburg in 1825 and founded a line that includes the Royal Houses of Denmark, Greece, Norway, and the Commonwealth realms.

Early life 
Friedrich Wilhelm was born in Lindenau, near Königsberg, East Prussia, to Friedrich Karl Ludwig, Duke of Schleswig-Holstein-Sonderburg-Beck (20 August 1757 – 24 April 1816) and Countess Friederike of Schlieben (28 February 1757 – 17 December 1827). He was the third and youngest child of the couple, and the only son. In 1804, he was sent to Denmark-Norway, where he was an officer of the Danish army during the Napoleonic Wars.

Marriage and issue 
On 26 January 1810, Friedrich Wilhelm married his relative Princess Louise Caroline of Hesse-Kassel (28 September 1789 – 13 March 1867), a granddaughter of Frederik V of Denmark through her mother, Princess Louise of Denmark. Friedrich Wilhelm and Louise Caroline had ten children: 
Princess Luise Marie Friederike of Schleswig-Holstein-Sonderburg-Glücksburg (23 October 1810 – 11 May 1869).
Princess Friederike Karoline Juliane of Schleswig-Holstein-Sonderburg-Glücksburg (9 October 1811 – 10 July 1902).
Karl, Duke of Schleswig-Holstein-Sonderburg-Glücksburg (30 September 1813 – 24 October 1878).
Friedrich, Duke of Schleswig-Holstein-Sonderburg-Glücksburg (23 October 1814 – 27 November 1885).
Prince Wilhelm of Schleswig-Holstein-Sonderburg-Glücksburg (10 April 1816 – 5 September 1893).
Christian IX, King of Denmark (8 April 1818 – 29 January 1906).
Princess Luise, Abbess of Itzehoe (18 November 1820 – 30 November 1894).
Prince Julius of Schleswig-Holstein-Sonderburg-Glücksburg (14 October 1824 – 1 June 1903).
Prince Johann of Schleswig-Holstein-Sonderburg-Glücksburg (5 December 1825 – 27 May 1911).
Prince Nikolaus of Schleswig-Holstein-Sonderburg-Glücksburg (22 December 1828 – 18 August 1849 in an accident).

Reign 
On 25 March 1816, Friedrich Wilhelm succeeded his father as Duke of Schleswig-Holstein-Sonderburg-Beck. On 6 July 1825, he became Duke of Glücksburg and changed his title to Duke of Schleswig-Holstein-Sonderburg-Glücksburg, after the elder Glücksburg line became extinct in 1779. Friedrich Wilhelm died on 17 February 1831 at Gottorp.

His grandchildren include among others Frederick VIII of Denmark, Queen Alexandra of the United Kingdom, George I of Greece, Empress Maria Feodorovna of Russia, Crown Princess Thyra of Hanover, Duchess of Cumberland and Teviotdale, and Friedrich Ferdinand, Duke of Schleswig-Holstein.

Honours 
  Grand Cross of the Dannebrog, 15 January 1811
  Knight of the Elephant, 19 December 1811
  Cross of Honour of the Order of the Dannebrog, 19 December 1811

Ancestry

References

External links 

 

1785 births
1831 deaths
Dukes of Schleswig-Holstein-Sonderburg-Beck
Dukes of Schleswig-Holstein-Sonderburg-Glücksburg
Nobility from Königsberg
People from East Prussia
Danish military personnel of the Napoleonic Wars
Grand Crosses of the Order of the Dannebrog
Recipients of the Cross of Honour of the Order of the Dannebrog
Military personnel from Königsberg
Participants to the Congress of Vienna